A Woman with Half Soul (Banhonnyeo) also known as The Ghost Lovers (Yan nu huan hun, 艷女還魂) is a 1973 South Korean horror film directed by Shin Sang-ok and starring Li Ching and Lee Seung-yong.

Plot
Han Do-ryeong goes to Yeon-hwa's house with the money, but is taken away by bandits and ends up staying at the house of Jang-soe, an old servant. The spirit of Yeon-hwa, who died without seeing her spouse Han Doryeong, appears to Han Doryeong every night and shares her unfulfilled feelings in this world. When Jangsoe sees his master playing with a ghost, he calls a shaman to perform an exorcism and attaches a talisman, but to no avail. In the end, Han Do-ryeong comes to her senses and distances herself from Yeon-hwa's spirit, but at Yeon-hwa's request, after sharing the last couple's affection, Yeon-hwa escapes from the bondage of the wandering ghost and goes to the underworld.

Cast
Li Ching- Yeon-hwa
Lee Seung-yong - Han Do-ryeong
Kim Mu-yeong -  Jangsoe
Joo Young -wife of Jangsoe
Go Seon-ae -Dalae the nanny
Kim Ki-ju -merchant
Lee Hyang-ja - Yeonsim, Yeonhwa's sister
Sin Chan-il -NamPyong, Husband of Yeonsim
Jin Bong-jin -Chunam
Lee Seung-il - Dok chil

References

External links

Films directed by Shin Sang-ok
1970s Korean-language films
South Korean horror films
1973 horror films